Prunella may refer to:

 Prunella (bird), also known as accentors or dunnocks
 Prunella (plant), also known as self-heal
 Prunella (grape), French wine grape also known as Cinsaut
 Prunella (fairy tale), an Italian fairy tale
 Prunella (film), 1918 silent film starring Marguerite Clark
 Prunella (given name)
 Prunella (horse), a Thoroughbred racehorse and broodmare
 Bargnolino, or sometimes prunella, Italian sloe gin
 Prunella (cloth), an 18th-century worsted fabric.